Jeorá Matos Ferreira (born May 8, 1964) is a former Brazilian football player.

Playing career
Ferreira joined Japanese J1 League club Verdy Kawasaki in 1992. On October 16, he played a match against Kashima Antlers at semifinal in J.League Cup. Although he played only this match, Verdy won the J.League Cup champions defeated Shimizu S-Pulse at final in November.

Club statistics

References

External links

1964 births
Living people
Brazilian footballers
Brazilian expatriate footballers
J1 League players
Tokyo Verdy players
Expatriate footballers in Japan
Association football forwards